The St Martin's Cathedral (or) is a church in Bratislava, Slovakia, and the cathedral of the Catholic Archdiocese of Bratislava.

It is situated at the western border of the historical city center below Bratislava Castle. It is the largest and one of the oldest churches in Bratislava, known especially for being the coronation church of the Kingdom of Hungary between 1563 and 1830.

Together with the castle on the hill adjacent, and somewhat similar in its striking, but fairly stark Gothic lines and colouring, St Martin's  spire dominates Old Town's skyline. The tower virtually formed a part of the town's fortifications, built as it was into the city's defensive walls.

As with the castle, the surroundings of St Martin's are as memorable as the structure itself. In the cathedral's case, this includes the picturesque remains of outbuildings in a spacious staired courtyard, and a working seminary with robed students on a cobblestone side-street.

A small but significant neighbour of the cathedral is a monument to the synagogue, which stood next door for centuries until the Communist government demolished it around 1970 to make room for a new Nový Most bridge. The cathedral contains the remains of Saint John the Merciful who died in the early 7th century.

Structure, shape and characteristics

The nave of the structure consists of three aisles divided by two rows of eight columns. The cathedral is constructed in the traditional crucifix shape.

Together with the castle on the hill adjacent, and somewhat similar in its striking but fairly stark Gothic lines and colouring, St Martin's 85 m spire dominates Old Town's skyline.

As with the castle, the surroundings of St Martin's are as memorable as the structure itself. The  cathedral sits amid picturesque remains of outbuildings in a spacious staired courtyard, and a working seminary with robed students on a cobblestoned side-street.  The tower is capped by a replica of the Hungarian Crown resting on a gilded pillow.

The altar is dominated by an equestrian statue group depicting St. Martin in a typical Hungarian hussar dress.  The saint is dividing his cloak to give part to a beggar as protection from the cold.

Construction history 
Long before the construction of the cathedral, the site had been the crossroads and contained the former centre of the town, a market and probably also a chapel.  Worship services were held at Bratislava Castle, where the chapter and provost's office had their seat. As the visits became less bearable and the castle's safety was threatened, King Emeric of Hungary requested the Pope Innocent II for permission to relocate the provost's office into forecastle, and The Pope assented in 1204. The church was relocated in 1221, and was originally built in Romanesque style and sanctified to the Holy Saviour.

As the town grew into a city and received additional privileges in 1291, the sanctuary became insufficient for its needs.  Construction of a new Gothic cathedral began in 1311 on the site of the earlier church and an adjacent cemetery.

Construction continued until 1452 due to the difficulty of construction and lack of funding.  For a period in the early fifteenth century, construction halted due to the Hussite Wars. In 1452, the church was finally completed and consecrated, however, work continued until the sixteenth century. During this period, a new long presbytery and the Gothic chapels of Czech Queen Sofia and of Saint Anne were added in the 15th century.

Eighteenth century additions to the sanctuary include the Baroque Chapel of St. John the Merciful, and serves as a mausoleum.  It was constructed at the price of 2000 pieces of gold at the expense of Cardinal Emeric Esterházy and the famous Baroque equestrian sculpture of St Martin was added in 1744. Both works were designed by Georg Rafael Donner

In 1760, the top of the Gothic tower was struck by lightning and later replaced by a Baroque one, which was subsequently destroyed by fire in 1835 and reconstructed in 1847 (with some modifications), and topped by the crown of St Stephen (see below)

The church attained its present-day appearance during the period 1869 to 1877, when it was re-Gothicised after suffering damage by fire, war, earthquake and other disasters.

Coronations 

The cathedral became the coronation church of the sovereigns of the Kingdom of Hungary in 1563, succeeding the Virgin Mary Church in Székesfehérvár, after the Ottoman Empire conquered that city.  On 8 September 1563, the Crown of St. Stephen was placed on the head of Maximilian II, son of Emperor Ferdinand I of Habsburg. In total, the coronations of 11 kings and queens plus 8 of their consorts occurred here between 1563 and 1830, including that of Maria Theresa of Austria.

List of crowned kings/queens and of their consorts, with dates in parentheses:

Crown of St Stephen

The tower is topped by a gold-plated replica of the Crown of St. Stephen. It was placed in 1847 following restoration of the damaged tower, to commemorate the cathedral's importance as a coronation church.

Catacombs, crypts and sepulchres

To date, three crypts have been discovered:

 Pálffy family crypt (krypta rodiny Pálffy) is located under the main altar (sanctuary) and is accessed from the exterior. Entrance to this crypt is at the northern side of the cathedral and is covered by a white marble slab bearing the coat of arms of the Pálffy family. Above is a funeral sculpture by Ján Draškovch from the year 1613, depicting a knight in armour and a sea shell. The Pálffy family was notable in Bratislava as they were the hereditary owners of the Bratislava Castle.
 Jesuit crypt (Jezuitská krypta) is accessible from the St Anna Chapel and is located under the road between the cathedral and the adjacent seminary.
 Archbishop crypt (Arcibiskupská krypta) is accessible from the St Anna Chapel and is the only crypt open to the public. It branches into four hallways under the nave in the direction of Kapitulská Street and contains over 90 graves.

Over the centuries, the cathedral's sepulchres filled with many significant figures, such as ecclesiastic dignitaries, presidents of the historic Pozsony county as well as Jozef Ignác Bajza, the author of the first Slovak novel, but also with dozens of bishops, canons, French priests fleeing the French revolution and many people outside the Catholic Church.

Present

Today, the church is deteriorating due to vibrations caused by heavy traffic on the access ramp to the nearby Nový Most bridge. Restoration efforts began in 1997 and the cathedral has been a national cultural monument since 11 November 2002.

Since 2003, it has hosted the Korunovačné slávnosti (Coronation Feasts) festival which re-enacts the coronation of one of the monarchs crowned in the cathedral. From 1995 to February 2008 it was the co-cathedral of the Archdiocese of Bratislava-Trnava.

Additional information
Video and Photo of reconstruction of gold-plated representation of the Crown of St. Stephen (in Slovak).

Picture gallery

See also
 List of cathedrals in Slovakia

References

External links

Dóm sv. Martina 

Saint Martin
Roman Catholic churches in Bratislava
Gothic architecture in Slovakia
Coronation church buildings
14th-century Roman Catholic church buildings in Slovakia
15th-century Roman Catholic church buildings in Slovakia
Roman Catholic churches completed in 1452